The Tofik Jashari Stadium, is a stadium in Shijak, Albania. It is primarily used for football matches and it is the home ground of Albanian First Division club KF Erzeni.

References

Buildings and structures in Shijak
Football venues in Albania